Wang Xin (born 10 November 1997) is a Chinese footballer who currently plays for Guangzhou R&F in the Chinese Super League.

Club career
Wang Xin joined Danish 1st Division side Vejle Boldklub in 2016 from Dalian Aerbin academy. He made his senior debut on 2 November 2016 in a 4–0 home win over Fremad Amager, coming on as a substitute for Viljormur Davidsen in the 75th minute.

On 1 January 2018, Wang transferred to Chinese Super League side Guangzhou R&F. On 6 April 2018, he made his debut for the club in a 2–0 home loss to Jiangsu Suning, coming on for Xiao Zhi in the 87th minute.

Career statistics
.

References

External links 

1997 births
Living people
Chinese footballers
People from Fushun
Footballers from Liaoning
Vejle Boldklub players
Guangzhou City F.C. players
Chinese Super League players
Association football defenders
Chinese expatriate footballers
Expatriate men's footballers in Denmark